Bathymunida rudis is a species of squat lobster in the family Munididae. The specific epithet is derived from the Latin rudis, meaning rough, which is in reference to the rough upper side of the carapace.

References

Squat lobsters
Crustaceans described in 1996